The HTC TyTN (also known as the HTC Hermes and the HTC P4500) is an Internet-enabled Windows Mobile Pocket PC PDA designed and marketed by High Tech Computer Corporation of Taiwan. It has a touchscreen with a left-side slide-out QWERTY keyboard. The TyTN's functions include those of a camera phone and a portable media player in addition to text messaging and multimedia messaging. It also offers Internet services including e-mail (including Microsoft's DirectPush push e-mail solution, as well as BlackBerry services with applications provided by BlackBerry-partnered carriers), instant messaging, web browsing, and local Wi-Fi connectivity. It is a quad-band GSM phone with GPRS, and EDGE, and a single/dual band UMTS phone with HSDPA. It is a part of the first line of PDAs directly marketed and sold by HTC. On AT&T/Cingular, the TyTN was the successor to the HTC Wizard, known as the Cingular 8125. Also on AT&T, the TyTN was superseded by the HTC TyTN II, known as the AT&T 8925 and the AT&T Tilt.

Versions 

Besides the branding differences, there are several models of the HTC TyTN: the TyTN 100, the TyTN 200, and the TyTN 300. The TyTN 100 has no front-facing camera or a .1-megapixel front-facing camera; the TyTN 200 has a .1-megapixel front-facing camera; and the TyTN 300 has a .3-megapixel front-facing camera. 

The TyTN Model was sold as:
 HTC TyTN 100
 AT&T/Cingular 8525 (US)
 Dopod 838Pro (Asia)
 i-mate JASJAM (Middle East)
 NTT DoCoMo hTc Z (Japan)
 O2 XDA Trion
 Orange United Kingdom SPV M3100
 Qtek 9600
 HTC TyTN 200
 Dopod CHT 9000
 HTC TyTN P4500
 SoftBank X01HT (Japan)
 Swisscom XPA v1605
 Vodafone v1605 (Europe)
 Vodafone VPA Compact III
 HTC TyTN 300
 T-Mobile MDA Vario II

ROM Updates 
The TyTN shipped with Windows Mobile 5 AKU 2.3. HTC released AKU3 ROMs to carriers, though it was up to the carriers to provide updates to end users. In July 2007, HTC released a generic update to Windows Mobile 6, freely available to the public. In November 2007, AT&T released an update to Windows Mobile 6.

Official ROM updates are or were available for several versions of the TyTN, including the AT&T/Cingular 8525, the Dopod 838Pro, the i-mate JASJAM, the O2 XDA Trion, and the Orange SPV M3100 (AKU 3.3.0). Some of these updates update the TyTN to Windows Mobile 5 AKU 3.n.n, others update it to Windows Mobile 6.

Specifications 
 Screen size: 
 Screen resolution: 240×320 pixels at 139 ppi, 4:3 aspect ratio, flips into 320x240 landscape mode when keyboard is slid out.
 Screen colors: 65536 (16-bit) colors
 Input devices: Touchscreen interface, slide-out QWERTY keyboard, and jog wheel
 Battery: 1300 or 1350 mAh, user-accessible
 Battery has up to 5–6 hours of talk on 3G network and up to 250 hours of standby.
 1.9 megapixel camera with fixed focus lens, LED flash, self-portrait mirror, and macro mode
 Location finding by detection of cell towers and Wi-Fi networks (through Google Maps Mobile)
 Samsung SC32442A (400 MHz ARM ARM920T processor)
 ATI Imageon Graphics Processing Unit
 RAM: 64 MB DRAM
 ROM: 128 MB flash memory
 Removable Media: microSD, up to 8GB (microSDHC, up to 32 GB if running Windows Mobile 6)
 Operating System: Windows Mobile 5.0 stock ROM with Windows Mobile 6 available to upgrade through HTC e-Club. Unofficial cooked roms for Windows Mobile 6.5 available.
 Quad band GSM / GPRS / EDGE (GSM 850, GSM 900, GSM 1800, GSM 1900)
 Tri band HSDPA (UMTS 850, UMTS 1900, UMTS 2100) A UMTS 800 band option appears on some updated phones, but has not been confirmed to work.
 Wi-Fi (802.11b/g)
 Bluetooth 2.0 + EDR
 Mini USB combo jack for data transfer, charging, and multi-purpose headset.
 Stereo headphone jack (certain models only?)
 IrDA
 Size:  (h)  (w)  (d)
 Weight:

Pre-Loaded Software 
(Varies by operator)

AT&T 8525 and Cingular 8525
 AOL Instant Messenger
 ClearVUE PDF
 Excel Mobile
 Good Mobile Messaging
 Pocket MSN
 PowerPoint Mobile
 Smart dialing
 TeleNav
 Windows Live Instant Messenger
 Word Mobile
 Xpress Mail
 Yahoo! Instant Messenger

Notes 
The TyTN has a GPS receiver, however it has no GPS antenna and the GPS is disabled both in ROM and physically through disconnection of certain pins on the circuit.

Early models of the TyTN (HT624xxx - HT632xxx) have been known to suffer from screen alignment problems and should be avoided.

See also 
 HTC Wizard
 HTC TyTN II
 High Tech Computer Corporation

References

Discussion Forums 
 HTC TyTN Forum
 HowardForums HTC Forum
 HowardForums Windows Mobile Professional Forum
 HTCGeeks Forum
 PDAPhoneHome HTC TyTN Forum
 PPCGeeks HTC TyTN Forum
 XDA-Developers HTC TyTN Forum

External links 
 XDA-Developers HTC TyTN Wiki
 The Hermes Guide, a website dedicated through guiding users through upgrading safely
 Custom built WM6.1 ROM for HTC TyTN and compatible devices

Mobile phones introduced in 2006
Digital audio players
TyTN
Windows Mobile Professional devices
Mobile phones with an integrated hardware keyboard
Mobile phones with infrared transmitter
Mobile phones with user-replaceable battery